G. pentaphylla may refer to:

 Geissois pentaphylla, a plant endemic to Vanikoro, Solomon Islands
 Glycosmis pentaphylla, a plant with edible fruit
 Gymnogonia pentaphylla, an annual wildflower
 Gynostemma pentaphylla, a climbing vine